Niklaus Riggenbach (21 May 1817 – 25 July 1899) was the inventor of the Riggenbach rack system and the counter-pressure brake. He was also an engineer and locomotive builder.

Niklaus Riggenbach, from Rünenberg, Basel-Landschaft, Switzerland, was born in Guebwiller, Alsace.  After the death of his father, his mother returned to Basel with her eight young children. At age 16 Riggenbach began an apprenticeship as a mechanic, going abroad after completing his training.  In 1837 he found his way to Paris, where he accepted employment.  By taking technical courses in night school, he acquired considerable knowledge in mathematics and physics.  With the opening of the Paris-St. Germain railroad line in 1839 he found his vocation to build locomotives.

In June 1840 he moved to Karlsruhe, Germany, and found employment in the machine works of Emil Kessler.  Here he soon rose to managing director and was involved in the construction of no less than 150 locomotives. One of these steam engines was the "Limmat" of the Schweizerischen Nordbahn (Swiss Northern Railway), opened on 9 August 1847, also called the Spanisch-Brötli line, which he ferried to Switzerland in order to test it on the Zürich-Baden line.

As construction of the Basel-Olten line began in 1853, the board of directors of the Schweizer Centralbahn Gesellschaft (Swiss Central Rail Association) appointed him chief of the machine works.  He made several official trips to England and Austria, and crawled under a fair number of steam locomotives and into their boilers, "to make the good even better."  Various improvements in railroading bear his name.  In 1856 he became a master machinist and boss of the new main workshop of the Centralbahn in Olten.  Under his direction this workshop evolved into a full-fledged engine works, building the company's own locomotives and bridges.

Track grip (adhesion) on the Hauenstein line caused him concern.  The difficulties led Riggenbach to the concept of the rack railway.  After many attempts he discovered that one could negotiate steeper stretches of track by bolting a rack between the rails, which a toothed wheel or cog on the underside of the locomotive could engage. He built his first locomotive in 1862, and on 12 August 1863 France awarded him Patent No. 59625 for the invention.  The Vitznau-Rigi line was inaugurated in 1871 as the first mountain railway to use the Riggenbach system in Europe. The locomotives were equipped with his counter-pressure braking system.

See also 
 Steep grade railway

References

Sources 

Niklaus Riggenbach

1817 births
1899 deaths
People from Guebwiller
19th-century Swiss inventors
Swiss railway mechanical engineers
Rack railways